The COVID-19 pandemic in Northern Cyprus is part of the ongoing pandemic of coronavirus disease 2019 caused by severe acute respiratory syndrome coronavirus 2.

The first case in Northern Cyprus was recorded on 10 March, when a local returned home from a trip to Europe. The first death due to COVID-19 in the country occurred on 28 March.

, Northern Cyprus has 5,746 confirmed cases, 4,922 recoveries, 28 deaths, and a death rate of 87 per million people, one of the lowest rates globally.

, Northern Cyprus's observed case-fatality rate stands at 0.52%, the 139th highest rate globally.

Background 
On 12 January 2020, the World Health Organization (WHO) confirmed that a novel coronavirus was the cause of a respiratory illness in a cluster of people in Wuhan City, Hubei Province, China, which was reported to the WHO on 31 December 2019.

The case fatality ratio for COVID-19 has been much lower than SARS of 2003, but the transmission has been significantly greater, with a significant total death toll.

Timeline

March 2020 
The first case of SARS-CoV-2 in Northern Cyprus was identified by the Health Minister Ali Pilli as a female German tourist on 9 March 2020.

On March 10, people found to have been in contact with the patient, including every passenger on the same plane were quarantined in three different hotels. Starting March 11, foreign nationals were barred from entering Northern Cyprus, with some exceptions for those holding valid Alien Resident Certificates, diplomatic credentials, or other official documentation and special permits. Restrictions have since been relaxed for the 100,000 foreign university students in the country.

On 12 March, the country's second case was confirmed, being the spouse of the German tourist who became the first person diagnosed with COVID-19.

On 13 March, the Health Minister Ali Pilli announced that five people have been tested positive for the coronavirus, up from two.

On 17 March, the 2020 Northern Cypriot presidential election was delayed for 6 months due to the outbreak.

On 24 March, over 840 German national tourists were sent back to Germany after being quarantined for 14 days.

On 28 March, the first person died from COVID-19.

April 2020 
North Cyprus announced a partial curfew until 10 April. The exception being for use of markets and acquisition of necessities. A full curfew is applied between 9pm and 6am until 10 April. Due to increase of cases, curfew states extended by the end of April. There is a suggestion that "curfew may continue until the end of the summer".

15 villages within the İskele/Karpaz district are under full curfew due to high number of cases.

Turkish Cypriot authorities banned movement between districts, meaning no one will be allowed to travel from one district to another.

Three students out of 800 who came from UK and were under self isolated quarantine for 14 days, have tested positive.

There have been no new reported cases of coronavirus infections for the past ten days and the last COVID-19 death in North Cyprus was on 13 April. Early medical intervention has meant 99 of those who tested positive for coronavirus in the TRNC have made a full recovery. As of 27 April, five people remained in hospital.

May 2020 
On 11 May, the last coronavirus patient has been discharged from hospital and there are no active cases left.

July 2020 
On 1 July, following 76 days of no community transmissions, one such case was reported and the country went back into lockdown.

October 2020 
On 17 October, after 188 days with no deaths, the country's fifth death from COVID-19 was reported.

Restrictions

Statistics

Data table

Graphs

Overview

Daily new cases

Daily tests

Test positivity rate

Case fatality rate

Reaction

On 11 March 2020, Turkish Cypriot Deputy Prime Minister and Foreign Minister Kudret Özersay said in a tweet that flights from Germany, France and Italy to Northern Cyprus would be suspended until 1 April 2020.

All flights around the world to the North Cyprus and as well as Cross points from the southern part To north side of the island is banned.

On 12 March 2020, the Turkish republic of northern Cyprus government shut schools and banned mass gatherings as precautionary measures to prevent the spread of the coronavirus, which the World Health Organization declared a pandemic.

All educational activities from nursery to university degree suspended physical systems. Primary and middle schools turned into the digital system and will complete 2019-2020 semester by this way. North Cyprus have more than 20 institutions of higher education. 18 of them are universities and nearly 100,000 international students. All higher education services suspended and turned into the digital system.

After 76 days of curfew and country wide quarantine cases were nulled. After reopening the ports to the international arrivals, COVID-19 cases rapidly increased rapidly. By the 11/09/2020 there were 541 cases.

See also
 COVID-19 pandemic by country and territory
 COVID-19 pandemic in Europe
 COVID-19 pandemic in Cyprus
 COVID-19 pandemic in Turkey

References

Coronavirus pandemic
Coronavirus pandemic
Northern Cyprus
Northern Cyprus
Northern Cyprus
Disease outbreaks in Northern Cyprus
Northern Cyprus
Coronavirus pandemic
Coronavirus pandemic